Pakistan Rah-e-Haq Party (PRHP) (Urdu:) is a Islamist Politico-Religious Party in Pakistan. It was founded by Ibrahim Khan Qasmi in February 2012.

History
Hakeem Muhammad Ibrahim Qasmi, a former provincial leader of Sipah-e-Sahaba Pakistan, founded the PRHP in Peshawar in February 2012. Qasmi was elected as member of the then NWFP Assembly from then PF-4, a constituency of Peshawar in 2002 Pakistani general election and after being elected he supported Muttahida Majlis-e-Amal, an electoral alliance of six religious parties.

See also 
 List of Deobandi organisations
Sipah-e-Sahaba Pakistan

References

Political parties in Pakistan
Islamic political parties in Pakistan
Far-right political parties in Pakistan
Deobandi organisations